Li Lei (born 24 June 1984 in Beijing, China) is a Chinese baseball player who is a member of Team China at the 2008 Summer Olympics.

Sports career
2003–Present Beijing Municipal Baseball Team; and
2004 National Team.

Major performances
2005 National Games - 2nd; and
2006 Asian Games - 4th.

References
Profile 2008 Olympics Team China

1984 births
2006 World Baseball Classic players
Baseball players at the 2006 Asian Games
Baseball players at the 2008 Summer Olympics
Baseball players at the 2010 Asian Games
Baseball players from Beijing
Chinese baseball players
Living people
Olympic baseball players of China
Asian Games competitors for China